Rameez Junaid and Philipp Marx were the defenders of title, but they lost to Johan Brunström and Jean-Julien Rojer in the semifinal.
Pablo Cuevas and Sergio Roitman withdrew in the final, so Brunström and Rojer became the new champions.

Seeds

Draw

Draw

References
 Doubles Draw

BSI Challenger Lugano - Doubles
BSI Challenger Lugano